Enrico Annoni (born 10 July 1966) is an Italian former professional footballer who played as a defender.

He played for several years in Serie A with Como, Torino and Roma. He then moved to Scotland to play for Celtic for two years, before returning home to Italy to care for his ill father. Annoni had a brief spell as assistant coach at Padova and then at Serie B side Catania in the same role.

Club career
Annoni began his career in the early 1980s as a defender with Serie D side, Seregno. In season 1983-84 he moved to Serie B side, Como and played 2 games in their successful campaign for promotion that year to Serie A. Annoni was then loaned out to Sambenedettese for two seasons before returning to Como for season 1987–88. He became a regular in the team, making 95 league appearances in 3 seasons. Annoni was now an established defender, able to play at either centre-back or full-back positions.

In 1990 Annoni joined Torino. He quickly became popular with the fans who nicknamed him 'Tarzan'. He picked up his first silverware in June 1991 when Torino beat Pisa in the final of the Mitropa Cup. He was then part of the Torino side that reached the UEFA Cup Final in 1992, playing in all the games leading up to the final and scoring in the first round against Knattspyrnufélag Reykjavíkur and second round against Boavista. Annoni played in the first leg of the final against Ajax, a 2–2 draw at home, but missed the second leg through suspension.  That match finished 0–0, with Ajax winning the UEFA Cup on the away goals rule.

In June 1993 Annoni picked up his first major silverware when Torino defeated Roma on away goals in the final of the Coppa Italia.

Annoni joined Roma in 1994. He was a regular in the team in his first two seasons there, but only made 12 league appearances in his third season, 1996–97.

In February 1997 Annoni moved abroad to join Scottish Premier Division side, Celtic. During his time in Scotland, he won the Scottish Premier Division title and the Scottish League Cup. He left Celtic in July 1999 to return to Italy to care for his ill father.

Annoni made a guest appearance for Celtic in May 2008 in the benefit game for former Celtic team-mate Phil O'Donnell, who died in December 2007 whilst playing for Motherwell.

Annoni is the subject of an anecdote whereby, in a match in the late 1990s where Celtic were performing poorly and Annoni had just been brought on as a substitute, a fan is reported to have exclaimed in his native Scots; "Aw naw, no Annoni oan an aw noo!" (Oh no, not Annoni on as well now!).

Managerial career
In July 2013, Annoni joined Dario Marcolin's coaching staff, becoming assistant coach at Serie B side Padova. He lasted just two months in this role, and was sacked in September along with Marcolin himself and goalkeeping coach Gaetano Petrelli.

On 3 January 2015, he followed Marcolin at Catania, becoming an assistant coach at the club.

Honours

Club
Celtic
 Scottish Premier League: 1997–98
 Scottish League Cup: 1997–98

Torino
 Coppa Italia: 1992–93
 Mitropa Cup: 1991
 UEFA Cup runner-up: 1991–92

Individual
Torino F.C. Hall of Fame: 2019

References

External links

Living people
1966 births
Association football central defenders
Como 1907 players
A.S. Sambenedettese players
Torino F.C. players
A.S. Roma players
Celtic F.C. players
Serie A players
Serie B players
Scottish Premier League players
Expatriate footballers in Scotland
Italian expatriate sportspeople in Scotland
Italian footballers
Italian expatriate footballers
Italy under-21 international footballers
Scottish Football League players
U.S. 1913 Seregno Calcio players